Millerosteus is an extinct genus of coccosteid arthrodire placoderm from the Early Givetian stage of the Middle Devonian period. Fossils are found in the Orkneys and Caithness, Scotland. Millerosteus is one of the few arthrodires known from specimens preserving the entire skeleton.

Phylogeny
Millerosteus is a member of the family Coccosteidae, which belongs to the clade Coccosteomorphi, one of the two major clades within Eubrachythoraci. The cladogram below shows the phylogeny of Millerosteus:

References

Coccosteidae
Givetian life
Fossils of Scotland
Fish described in 1959